Yanbaris (Bashkir and ) is a rural locality (a village) in Kisak-Kainsky Selsoviet, Yanaulsky District, Bashkortostan, Russia. The population was 101 as of 2010. There are 3 streets.

Geography 
Yanbaris is located 22 km southwest of Yanaul (the district's administrative centre) by road. Kisak-Kain is the nearest rural locality.

References 

Rural localities in Yanaulsky District